Mahatma Jagjeevan Sahab Mahavidyalaya is located in Ram Nagar, Amaniganj, Uttar Pradesh, which grants the degree of bachelor of education, Bachelor of Science etc. The college is affiliated to Dr. Ram Manohar Lohia Awadh University.

Undergraduate

 Bachelor of Arts (B.A)
 Bachelor of Education (B.Ed)
 Bachelor of Science (B.Sc.)

Postgraduate

 Master of Arts (M.A)
 Master of Commerce (M.Com)

References

External links
 

Universities and colleges in Uttar Pradesh
Colleges of Dr. Ram Manohar Lohia Awadh University
Education in Faizabad